Christian Di Candia Cuña (born 1981 in Montevideo) is a Uruguayan politician, belonging to the Broad Front.

From April 2019 till November 2020 he was the Intendant of Montevideo, after succeeding Daniel Martínez.

References 

1981 births
Living people
Intendants of Montevideo
Broad Front (Uruguay) politicians
Uruguayan people of Italian descent
People from Montevideo